Werner Zeyer (25 May 1929 – 26 March 2000) was a German politician (CDU) who served as Minister-President of Saarland from 1979 to 1985.

References

External links

1929 births
2000 deaths
People from Sankt Wendel (district)
Christian Democratic Union of Germany politicians
20th-century German politicians
Ministers-President of Saarland